Epimedium, also known as barrenwort, bishop's hat, fairy wings, horny goat weed, or yin yang huo, is a genus of flowering plants in the family Berberidaceae. The majority of the species are endemic to China, with smaller numbers elsewhere in Asia, and a few in the Mediterranean region.

Epimedium species are deciduous or evergreen hardy perennials. The majority have four-parted "spider-like" flowers in spring.

The species used as a dietary supplement is Epimedium grandiflorum. It contains icariin, which is a weak PDE5 inhibitor in vitro. Its clinical effects are unknown. There is little clinical evidence, but it is thought to have erectogenic properties and is found in some men's sexual health supplements.

Description

Species of Epimedium are herbaceous perennials, growing from an underground rhizome. Their growth habits are somewhat variable. Some have solitary stems, others have a "tufted" habit, with multiple stems growing close together. There may be several leaves to a stem or the leaves may be solitary, produced from the base of the plant. Individual leaves are generally compound, often with three leaflets, but also with more. Leaflets usually have spiny margins. The leaves may be annual, making the plant deciduous, or longer lasting, so that the plant is evergreen. The inflorescence is an open raceme or panicle, the number of flowers varying by species.

Individual flowers have parts in fours. There are four smaller outer sepals, usually greenish and shed when the flower opens. Moving inwards, these are followed by four larger petal-like inner sepals, often brightly coloured. Inside the sepals are four true petals. These may be small and flat, but often have a complex shape including a nectar-producing "spur" that may be longer than the sepals. There are four stamens.

One of the common names for the genus, bishop's hat, arises from the shape of the flowers, particularly where the spurs are longer than the sepals.

Taxonomy
The genus was given its name by Carl Linnaeus in 1753, in describing the European species E. alpinum. The name is a Latinized version of a Greek name for an unidentifiable plant, epimedion, that is mentioned in Pliny's Natural History (xxvii.57). The meaning of the original name is unclear.

 Accepted species (65)

Hybrids

Some artificial hybrids are cultivated in gardens. These include:

E. × cantabrigiense Stearn, hybrid between E. alpinum and E. pubigerum
E. × perralchicum Stearn, hybrid between E. perralderianum and E. pinnatum subsp. colchicum
E. × rubrum Morr., hybrid between E. alpinum and E. grandiflorum
E. × versicolor Morr., hybrid between E. grandiflorum and E. pinnatum subsp. colchicum
E. × warleyense Stearn, hybrid between E. alpinum and E. pinnatum subsp. colchicum
E. × youngianum Fisch & C.A.Mey, hybrid between E. diphyllum and E. grandiflorum

Cultivation
Some varieties and hybrids have been in Western cultivation for the last 100 to 150 years. There is now a wide array of new Chinese species being cultivated in the West, many of which have only recently been discovered, and some of which have yet to be named. There are also many older Japanese hybrids and forms, extending the boundaries of the genus in cultivation. The majority of the Chinese species have not been fully tested for hardiness nor indeed for any other aspect of their culture. The initial assumption that the plants would only thrive where their native conditions could be closely replicated have proven to be overly cautious, as most varieties are proving extraordinarily amenable to general garden and container cultivation.

The cultivar 'Amber Queen' is a recipient of the Royal Horticultural Society's Award of Garden Merit.

Propagation
While they can be successfully propagated in early spring, epimediums are best divided in late summer, with the aim of promoting rapid re-growth of roots and shoots before the onset of winter. Several breeders (in particular Darrell Diano Probst, Tim Branney & Robin White) have also undertaken their own hybridization programmes with the genus.  Various new nursery selections are gradually appearing in the horticulture trade, the best of which extend the colour and shape range of the flowers available to the gardener.

Chemistry 
Epimedium wushanense contains a number of flavonoids. 37 compounds were characterized from the underground and aerial parts of the plant. Among them, 28 compounds were prenylflavonoids. The predominant flavonoid, epimedin C, ranged from 1.4 to 5.1% in aerial parts and 1.0 to 2.8% in underground parts.

Citations

General and cited references

External links 
 
 

 
Berberidaceae genera
Medicinal plants